The All American Red Heads were the first professional women's basketball teams. In 1936, almost 50 years after women's basketball began, C. M. "Ole" Olson (who also founded Olson's Terrible Swedes) started a barnstorming team which would play around the country until 1986. The name of the team came from Olson's wife, who owned a number of beauty salons in the south. They played by men's rules and were a smash success with the audience.  They were so successful as an exhibition team that they fostered two other teams, the Ozark Hillbillies and the Famous Red Heads.

Two of the early players for the team were Geneva (Jean) and Jo Langerman. Jean and Jo were the twin daughters of "Mama" Langerman, an unmarried beautician who moved from town to town. The twins led three teams to the Iowa state tournament, finishing third in 1931 at Whittemore, Iowa, and winning the state championships while at Parkersburg, and Hampton, Iowa in 1932, and 1933. Following their high school career, they played for an AAU team, winning the national championship in 1934, then joined the All American Red Heads. As a result of their accomplishments, they were inducted into the Iowa Girls High School Athletic Union Basketball Hall of Fame.

Orwell Moore, a high school coach, coached two of the teams from 1948 and then purchased them.  The teams boasted AAU All-American players and stars like Peggy Lawson, Kay Kirkpatrick, and Hazel Walker.  Other stars included Willa “Red” Mason, Johnny Farley, Barb Hostert, 
Jolene Ammons and Cheryl Clark. Orwell Moore's wife, Lorene “Butch” Moore, was also a 
spectacular Red Heads player.  Through the 1960s and 1970s, three teams toured. During the off-season, players taught basketball to girls. Orwell also began Camp Courage, a basketball camp for girls.  Charlotte Adams, Glenda Hall, Kay O'Bryan and Jolene Ammons became player coaches.

The All American Red Heads had up to three teams on the road at the same time.  Seasons ran from October to late April or early May.  The season consisted of approximately 200 games and the teams would travel over 60,000 miles by car.

Sources
 Barnstorming America, Stories from the Pioneers of Women's Basketball

Awards and honors

In February 2010, the team was honored at part of National Girls and Women in Sports Day in Minnesota.

In July 2010, the All American Red Heads were honored at the Senior Pan-American games in Eugene, Oregon.  They also had a reunion there. It was at this tournament that players laced up their sneakers one more time and played alumni from the NBA Portland Trail Blazers.

The team was honored by the Women's Basketball Hall of Fame for their contributions to the game. The team was recognized in a display entitled "Trailblazers of the Game" at the 2011 Induction Ceremony on June 11, 2011.

On April 2, 2012, the team was announced as a member of the Naismith Memorial Basketball Hall of Fame induction class of 2012. The Red Heads were formally enshrined on September 7.

In 2017 the team was inducted into the Missouri Sports Hall of Fame.

In 2020 the team will be inducted into the Arkansas Sports Hall of Fame.

See also
 Timeline of women's basketball history

Notes

External links
 
 Women’s Basketball Hall of Fame All-American Red Heads Recognized at 2011 Induction
  "Bob Sansevere: Hall and fame find All American Red Heads, women's basketball pioneers," St. Paul Pioneer Press, April 15, 2012

Defunct women's basketball teams in the United States
Naismith Memorial Basketball Hall of Fame inductees
Basketball teams established in 1936
1936 establishments in Iowa
Sports clubs disestablished in 1986
1986 disestablishments in the United States